Amirabad (also Romanized as Amīrābād) is a village in Gughar Rural District, in the Central District of Baft County, Kerman Province, Iran. At the 2006 census, its population was 920, in 222 families.

References 

Populated places in Baft County